Robe is an unincorporated community in Snohomish County, in the U.S. state of Washington.

History
A post office called Robe was established in 1894, and remained in operation until 1954. The community bears the name of a local pioneer.

References

Unincorporated communities in Snohomish County, Washington
Unincorporated communities in Washington (state)